The Punisher: Original Motion Picture Score is the score to the 1989 film of the same name. The album was composed, orchestrated and conducted by Dennis Dreith. It was released on July 19, 2005 on CD, it also features a 23 minutes interview with composer Dreith and the director Mark Goldblatt. The interview focuses not only on the music itself but also much about the ill-fated circumstances which concerned the release of the original film.

Track listing

Bonus
Including an interview with composer Dennis Dreith and director Mark Goldblatt.

Production

Harry Garfield also produced another song Vicious Mind, which is not included on the disc.

Release
Despite the film being from 1989 the score was not officially released before 2005. Dennis Dreith, the composer, has expressed relief that it has finally been released.

Reception

William Ruhlmann of AllMusic expressed that the score is not a lost classic but that it is worth while for anyone who enjoys the movie and that it is nonetheless seen as superior to that of the 2004 film by most critics.

References

External links
 IMDB

Film scores
Punisher in music